Coleophora mexicana is a moth of the family Coleophoridae. It is found in Tamaulipas in Mexico.

References

mexicana
Moths described in 1994
Moths of Central America